PQ may refer to:

Places 
 Province of Quebec, the largest province of Canada by area
 Rancho Peñasquitos, San Diego, informally

Politics and law 
 Parti Québécois, a provincial political party in Quebec, Canada
 Parliamentary question, a question posed during Question time in a Westminster system legislature
 Previous question, a motion in Robert's Rules of Order to close debate

Computing and electronics
 Perceptual Quantizer, a transfer function for video display
 Picture quality; see video quality
 Power quality, the set of limits of electrical properties
Priority queue, an abstract data structure

Software
 PowerQuest, a producer of computer HDD software tools for the DOS/Windows platform
 Priority queuing, a data packet scheduling technique
 libpq, a C library for the PostgreSQL database

Videogames
 Police Quest, a video game series
 Police Quest: In Pursuit of the Death Angel (1987 video game), first game in the series
 PQ: Practical Intelligence Quotient (2005 video game), first game in the series
 Persona Q: Shadow of the Labyrinth, a 2014 video game

Science, technology, and mathematics

Psychology
 Play Quotient, a theory in child development developed by Stevanne Auerbach
 Precision questioning, an intellectual toolkit for critical thinking and for problem solving

Chemistry, biochemistry, pharmacology
 Performance qualification, in pharmaceutics, part of verification and validation
 Plastoquinone, a molecule involved in photosynthesis

Other uses 
 PQ International, a polo magazine
 PQ, outbound Arctic convoys of World War II

See also
 PQ1 (disambiguation)
 PQ2 (disambiguation)
 PQ3 (disambiguation)